The Route 128A designation was used in the 1950s along the old sections of Route 128 as sections of the Yankee Division Highway were put into service. 128A was in Wakefield, Reading and Woburn This route no longer exists.

References

128A